Pholcitrichocyclus is a genus of Australian cellar spiders that was first described by Ceccolini & Cianferoni, in 2022.

Species
 it contains twenty-three species, found in Queensland, South Australia, the Northern Territory, and Western Australia:
Pholcitrichocyclus arabana (Huber, 2001) – Australia (Western Australia, Northern Territory, South Australia)
Pholcitrichocyclus aranda (Huber, 2001) – Australia (Western Australia, Northern Territory)
Pholcitrichocyclus arawari (Huber, 2001) – Australia (Western Australia)
Pholcitrichocyclus arnga (Huber, 2001) – Australia (Western Australia)
Pholcitrichocyclus balladong (Huber, 2001) – Australia (Western Australia)
Pholcitrichocyclus bugai (Huber, 2001) – Australia (Western Australia)
Pholcitrichocyclus djauan (Huber, 2001) – Australia (Northern Territory)
Pholcitrichocyclus gnalooma (Huber, 2001) – Australia (Western Australia)
Pholcitrichocyclus grayi (Huber, 2001) – Australia (Northern Territory)
Pholcitrichocyclus harveyi (Huber, 2001) – Australia (Western Australia)
Pholcitrichocyclus hirsti (Huber, 2001) – Australia (South Australia)
Pholcitrichocyclus kokata (Huber, 2001) – Australia (South Australia)
Pholcitrichocyclus kurara (Huber, 2001) – Australia (Western Australia)
Pholcitrichocyclus nigropunctatus (Simon, 1908) (type) – Australia (Western Australia)
Pholcitrichocyclus nullarbor (Huber, 2001) – Australia (Western Australia, South Australia)
Pholcitrichocyclus oborindi (Huber, 2001) – Australia (Queensland)
Pholcitrichocyclus pandima (Huber, 2001) – Australia (Western Australia)
Pholcitrichocyclus pustulatus (Deeleman-Reinhold), 1995 – Australia (Queensland)
Pholcitrichocyclus septentrionalis (Deeleman-Reinhold, 1993) – Australia (Western Australia)
Pholcitrichocyclus ungumi (Huber, 2001) – Australia (Western Australia)
Pholcitrichocyclus warianga (Huber, 2001) – Australia (Western Australia)
Pholcitrichocyclus watta (Huber, 2001) – Australia (Northern Territory)
Pholcitrichocyclus worora (Huber, 2001) – Australia (Western Australia)

See also
 List of Pholcidae species

References

Araneomorphae genera
Pholcidae
Spiders of Australia